Wilde Street Meadow is an  biological Site of Special Scientific Interest between Lakenheath and Mildenhall in Suffolk, England.

This site has a long history of traditional management, with low intensity summer grazing. It has areas of species-rich calcareous grassland, damp pasture, scrub and dykes. There is a large population of green-winged orchids.

The site is private land with no public access.

References

Sites of Special Scientific Interest in Suffolk